Rani Chandra (1949 – 1976), born in Kochi, Kerala, was a Malayalam film actress and winner of the Miss Kerala Title. She died in a plane crash in 1976. She acted in several landmark films such as Nellu (Malayalam, 1974), Bhadrakali (Tamil, 1976) and Swapnadanam (Malayalam, 1976).

Background
She was born to Chandran and Kanthimathi in 1949 at Fort Kochi, Travancore-Cochin (now Kerala). She had four sisters and a brother. She pursued degree from St Thereses College Ernakulam. She owned a dance troupe. Actress Chippy is Ranichandra's Brother Shaji's Daughter. Rani Chandra was selected as Miss Kerala in 1972.

Career
Her first film, Anjusundarikal, was widely accepted by the audience. Other major films included Ulsavam, Kadarumasam, Nellu, Swapnadanam, Oonjal, Alinganam, Abhinandanam, Sindoooram, Thirumadhuram, and Anuragam. She won the Kerala State Film Award for Best Actress for the film Swapnadanam. Rani Chandra played the major role in the very popular Tamil cinema song in the film Bhadrakali.

Death
Rani Chandra, her mother, and three sisters were killed in Indian Airlines Flight 171 crash in 1976. They were on a return flight from Bombay when their plane caught fire and nose dived near the airport, killing everyone on board.  They were returning from a Dance performance in the Middle East. Their earlier flight from Bombay to Madras returned to Bombay shortly after takeoff after a snag hit. The aircraft and all passengers were re-boarded onto the flight. The dead included members of her music troupe as well.

After her death, the unfinished portion of the movie Bhadrakali was finished using a double. The movie ends using earlier footage of Rani Chandra.

Awards
Kerala State Film Awards:

 1975 - Best Actress - Swapnadanam

Filmography

Malayalam

 Oonjal (1977)
 Sindooram (1976)
 Amba Ambika Ambaalika(1976) as Ambika
 Ayalkkaari (1976) as Sathi
 Swapnaadanam (1976) as Sumithra
 Chirikkudukka (1976) as Malathi
 Anaavaranam (1976)
 Mallanum Mathevanum (1976)
 Muthu (1976)
 Madhuram Thirumadhuram (1976) as Radha
 Lakshmivijayam (1976)
 Swimming Pool (1976)
 Abhinandanam (1976) as Radha
 Udyaanalakshmi (1976)
 Aalinganam (1976) as Dr. Raji
 Malsaram (1975)
 Criminals (Kayangal) (1975)
 Swarnna Malsyam (1975)
 Hello Darling (1975) as Sumithra
 Mucheettukalikkaarante Makal (1975) as Zainaba
 Ayodhya (1975)
 Chalanam (1975) as Joyamma
 Odakkuzhal (1975)
 Ulsavam (1975) as Leela
 Love Marriage (1975) as Viji
 Ullaasayaathra (1975)
 Boy Friend (1975)
 Swaami Ayyappan (1975)
 Swarnnavigraham (1974)
 Bhoogolam Thiriyunnu (1974) as Vijayamma
 Naathoon (1974)
 Poonthenaruvi (1974) as Vimala
 Devi Kanyaakumaari (1974)
 Shaapamoksham (1974)
 Sapthaswarangal (1974) as Mini
 Youvanam (1974) as Sharada
 Kaamini (1974) 
 Nellu (1974) as Javani
 Soundarya Pooja (1973)
 Swapnam (1973) as Vasumathi
 Udayam (1973) as Hema
 Kaattuvithachavan (1973)
 Police Ariyaruthu (1973) as Alice
 Kaalachakram (1973) as Geetha.
 Ragging (1973)
 Pacha Nottukal(1973) as Rosie
 Aaraadhika (1973) as Latha
 Jesus (1973) as Kanaikkari
 Kaapaalika(1973) as Lillykutti
 Ajnaathavasam(1973) as Kamala
 Driksaakshi (1973) as Rajamma
 Omana (1972) as Pennamma
 Brahmachaari (1972)
 Puthrakameshti (1972)
 Sree Guruvayoorappan (1972)
 Devi (1972)
 Chembarathi (1972) as Savithri
 Prathidhwani (1971)
 Vivaaham Swargathil (1970)
 Vivahasammanam (1970) as Sundari
 Anaachaadhanam (1969)
 Anchusundarikal (1968)
 Pavappettaval (1967) (credited as Miss Kerala)

Tamil
Bhadrakali (1976)
Swami Ayyappan (1975)
Then Sindhudhe Vaanam (1975)
Radha (1973)
Porchilai (1969)

References

External links
 
 http://en.msidb.org/displayProfile.php?category=actors&artist=Ranichandra&limit=67
 Weblokam : Rani Chandra- A paining memory

Actresses from Kochi
Kerala State Film Award winners
1976 deaths
Victims of aviation accidents or incidents in India
Actresses in Tamil cinema
Actresses in Malayalam cinema
Indian film actresses
20th-century Indian actresses
1949 births
St. Teresa's College alumni